Arthur Bárdos (1892–1974) was a leading Hungarian writer and theatre director. He left Hungary in 1949, moving to Britain where he staged Shakespeare's Hamlet.

Selected filmography
 The Queen of Spades (1927)
 A Scandal in Paris (1928)
 The Gallant Hussar (1928)

References

Bibliography
 Kennedy, Dennis.  Foreign Shakespeare: Contemporary Performance''. Cambridge University Press, 2004.

External links

1892 births
1974 deaths
Writers from Budapest
Male screenwriters
Hungarian male writers
Hungarian theatre directors
20th-century Hungarian screenwriters